Richard Richards (22 September 1787 – 27 November 1860) was the member of Parliament for the constituency of Merioneth from 1836 to 1852. He was a Master of the Court of Chancery.

References 

1787 births
1860 deaths
Members of Parliament for Merioneth
Deputy Lieutenants of Merionethshire
British barristers